Tokyo 23 Football Club (東京23フットボールクラブ, Tōkyō Ni-Jū San Futtobōrukurabu) commonly known as Tokyo 23 FC (東京23FC, Tōkyō Ni-Jū San Efushi) is a Japanese football club based in the 23 special wards of Tokyo. Their motto is "Tokyo Pride" (Be Pride of the Tokyoites). The club now participates in the first division of Kanto Soccer League, which part of Japanese Regional Leagues, the 5th level of the Japanese football league system, and they're aiming towards pro football.

History

Establishment
Tokyo 23 Football Club was established as Sagawa Tokyo 23 Soccer Club in 2003.

Tokyo League
Tokyo 23 FC was promoted to Division 1 in 2006, but they hovered around 7th to 11th their position until 2010 for 4 years.

On February 3, 2010, Tokyo 23  Corporation. was established for management. In April 2010, Tokyo 23 Soccer Club was renamed to Tokyo 23 FC.

On January 15, 2012, Tokyo 23 FC fought against Tonan Maehashi Satellite to be raised to Kanto Soccer League 2nd Division, and Tokyo 23 FC won by 1–0.

Kanto Soccer League
On October 7, 2012, Tokyo 23 won the Kanto Soccer League's 2nd Division, three points clear off runners-up Hitachi Building System SC.

League record

Current squad

Honours
 Tokyo Shakaijin Soccer League
Tokyo Shakaijin Soccer League Division 4 Block 19 Win (2003)
38th Tokyo Shakaijin Soccer League Division 3 Block 6 Win (2004)
39th Tokyo Shakaijin Soccer League Division 2 Win (2005)
44th Tokyo Shakaijin Soccer League Division 1 Win (2010)
28th Tokyo Shakaijin Soccer League Division 1 Cup tournament Runner-up (November 28, 2010)
45th Tokyo Shakaijin Soccer League Division 1 Win (2011)
48th Tokyo Shakaijin Soccer League Division 1 Win (2014)
 Kanto Soccer League
45th Kanto Soccer League 2nd Division Win (2012)
49th Kanto Soccer League 1st Division Win (2016)
5th KSL Ichihara Cup tournament Win (2012)
 Japan Football Association
47th All Japan Senior Football Championship Kanto regional Tournament Win (2011)
47th All Japan Senior Football Championship Final Tournament Win (2011)

References

External links
 Official site
 Official Facebook page
 Official Twitter profile
 Official YouTube channel
 Official blog

Football clubs in Japan
Football clubs in Tokyo
Association football clubs established in 2003
2003 establishments in Japan